Karrinyup was an electoral district of the Legislative Assembly in the Australian state of Western Australia from 1962 to 1989.

The district was based in the beachside northern suburbs of Perth. First contested at the 1962 state election, it was won by Liberal Country League candidate Les Nimmo, who was at the time member for the abolished Wembley Beaches.

Karrinyup was abolished ahead of the 1989 state election. The then sitting member, Liberal MP Jim Clarko, successfully contested the new seat of Marmion.

Members for Karrinyup

Election results 

Karrinyup